The 1864 United States presidential election in New Jersey took place on November 8, 1864, as part of the 1864 United States presidential election. Voters chose seven representatives, or electors to the Electoral College, who voted for president and vice president.

New Jersey voted for the Democratic candidate, George B. McClellan, over the National Union candidate, incumbent Abraham Lincoln. McClellan won his home state by a narrow margin of 5.68%. New Jersey was one of the three states McClellan won, with the other two being neighboring Delaware and Kentucky.

Results

See also
 United States presidential elections in New Jersey

References

New Jersey
1864
1864 New Jersey elections